The Hohenbol is a mountain of Baden-Württemberg, Germany.

Hohenbol (Baden-Württemberg)
Type Witnesses Mountain of volcanic origin

The Hohenbol is a foothill of the Teckberg and upstrimes this northwest.
The Teckberg and the summit of Hohenbol (above the orchard slope) are a nature reserve protected area.

The Hohenbol is a witness mountain of volcanic origin. He is one of the 355 volcanoes that are known from the "Urach volcanic area".

Geology
It is originated in the Miocene, when one of the volcanic vents of the Swabian volcano forced its way through the surrounding rock. Through erosion of Hohenbol was (especially in the west and north) exposed the softer surrounding material.

Other
With a distinctive group of black pines on its summit, the Hohenbol is clearly visible.
The area of the Hohenbol belongs to the nature reserve Teck.

References

Card services of the Federal Agency for Nature Conservation ( Notes )
John Baier: Hohenbol and Götz Brühl - two volcanic vents at the bottom of Teck In: Fossils 33 (1), pp 38–41 2016.

External links 
 www.themenpark-umwelt.baden-wuerttemberg.de:  &  & 
 www.biosphaere-alb.com: 

Mountains and hills of Baden-Württemberg
Mountains under 1000 metres
Mountains and hills of the Swabian Jura